The main campus of the University of Sopron (abbreviated SOE) is located in Sopron, Hungary.

The school traces its roots to 1735. The QS World University Rankings placed the University of Sopron in the 251-300 range in the Emerging Europe and Central Asia in 2022.

Faculties
 Benedek Elek Faculty of Pedagogy in Sopron
 Faculty of Forestry in Sopron
 Faculty of Wood Sciences and Creative Industries in Sopron
 Alexander Lamfalussy Faculty of Economics in Sopron

See also
 Open access in Hungary

References

External links
 Official site of the university

West Hungary, University of
Forestry education
Forestry in Hungary
Education in Győr-Moson-Sopron County
Sopron
Buildings and structures in Győr-Moson-Sopron County
Universities and colleges formed by merger in Hungary